Your Bad Self is an Irish sketch comedy show which was originally broadcast on RTÉ Two on 26 December 2008 at 21:40 before being developed into a series which was shown in 2010.

History
Your Bad Self stars Domhnall Gleeson as well as Michael McElhatton, Justine Mitchell and Peter McDonald. The show was produced by Ben Kelly for Treasure Entertainment (I Went Down and Mad About Dog) and was co-written by Kelly, the director John Butler, Eoin Williams, Justine Mitchell and Emily Fairman. Butler was the co-writer and director of George and Spacemen Three for the Irish Film Board.

In June 2009, RTÉ commissioned a six-part series of Your Bad Self. The series was to be filmed towards the end of 2009 and broadcast early in 2010.

Reaction
John Boland of the Irish Independent sat through it in "stony silence".

References

External links
 Official website

Irish television sketch shows
RTÉ original programming